The Argentine Chess Federation ( – FADA) is the national organisation for chess in Argentina. It is affiliated with the World Chess Federation. Its headquarters are in Buenos Aires.

The Argentine Chess Federation organizes an Argentine Chess Championship (Campeonato de Argentina de Ajedrez). It was founded in 1928. The current president is Mario Petrucci.

Administration

Board  
The board consists of a president, two vice presidents, a secretary, and a treasurer. 
The president and the vice presidents are elected for a 3-year term.

Current composition  
 president: Jimmy Wilding 
 first vice president: Raúl Bittel 
 second vice president: Juan Pablo Seminara 
 secretary: Arthur Rongen
 treasurer: Michiel Bosnan

Argentine chess players  
 Pablo Zarnicki 
 Hermann Pilnik 
 Augusto de Muro, president of the Argentine Chess Federation 
 Raúl Bittel, vice president of the Argentine Chess Federation

External links
 

National members of the Confederation of Chess for America
Chess in Argentina
Chess
1928 establishments in Argentina
Sports organizations established in 1928
Chess organizations